Facts

The case was handled by the Bombay High Court, citation of the case AIR 1989 Bom 331 and was decided by Justice S. Manohar. In this case, the plaintiffs (Garware Plastics and Polyester) had the right as way of assignment to telecast a cinematography film by means of video cassettes. One of the plaintiffs has granted the right of telecasting their films to the Government of India on their channel Doordarshan but have retained with themselves the right to telecast films via cable TV.

The defendant (Telelinks) bought the copyrighted videocassettes of the plaintiff and have shown the film on their Cable T.V.  Thereby infringing the copyright of the plaintiff in respect to public performance which is an exclusive right granted under the Indian Copyright Act, 1957.

Main question of law

Whether by showing video films over Cable T.V. to various subscribers the defendants are broadcasting video films to the public and have infringed the copyright of the plaintiffs.

Main statutory provisions applied

Under Section 13(1), “A copyright is recognized in respect to cinematography films”.[1] Under S. 2(f), “Cinematography film”, is defined to “include the sound track, if any, and cinematography shall be constructed as including any work produced by any process analogous to cinematography”.

S. 14(1)(c), ""copyright in a cinematography film", means the exclusive right to do or authorize the doing of any of the following acts, namely: (I) to make a copy of the film: (ii) to cause the film, in so far as it consists if visual images, to be seen in public and, in so far as it consists of sounds, to be heard in public : (iii) to make any record embodying the recording in any part of the sound track associated with the film by utilizing such sound track: (iv) to communicate the film by broadcast."

S. 51. "Copyright in a work shall be deemed to be infringed, inter alia, when any person, without a license granted by the Copyright under the Act, does anything the exclusive right to do which is by this Act conferred upon the owner of the copyright.

Contention of the Defendant

The defendant argued that showing the film by means of cable t.v, the broadcast is only limited to private space of the subscribers; therefore it isn’t a broadcast to the public.

Various Case laws applied in the case

To understand the difference between public and private broadcasting the following cases were referred to in the case.

1.In Harms (Incorporated), Ltd and Chappell and Company Ltd vs Martans Club Limited

The plaintiffs were the owners of a play, “Tip Toes”. The defendant was a club, the club showed the play in the club. The main question before the court was, whether such an act was in public?

The court held that the purpose of the Act was to protect the author from any injury or loss of profit by reasons of any representation of his composition in public, which would have ordinarily fetched him financial gain. The Court distinguished “such an audience from a private or domestic audience which would consist of members of the family and members of the household. The court also considered the place where the performance took place. And held that the club, which accepted members from the public and guests, cannot be considered as a place which was equivalent to an enlarged family.

2.Messager vs British Broadcasting Company, Ltd

The plaintiff was the composer of a comic opera, “The little Michus”, he gave the right to perform the opera to the producer, who in turn gave a license to BBC to broadcast it. The plaintiff filed a suit against BBC as he didn’t have a contract with them. BBC argued that the performance of the opera would take place in the privacy of its studio thereby as per the English Copyright Act, this wasn’t a broadcast to the public. The Court however rejected this assertion and held that since the opera was to be broadcast via wireless technology it was a broadcast to the public.

The decision was reverted by the Court of Appeals, stating the agreement between the plaintiff and the producer and BBC.

3. Jennings vs Stephens

The Duston Women’s Institute without the consent of the plaintiff performed a performance of a copyrighted play. The Court concluded, that, “mere numbers cannot be the test.” The Court held, the true test is the, “character of the audience.”

The second test as given by the Court was, “ in public", must be understood in relation to the owner of the copyright, that is performing in front of his/her public.

The Court held that the performance was performed in private.

4.Performance Right Society Ltd vs Hawthorns Hotel Ltd

The Court applied the above test in this case and held that the performance in the lounge of the hotel was a performance in public.

5. Ernest Turner Electrical Instruments Ltd vs Performance Right Society Ltd

The court applied the Jennings vs Stephens test to see the nature of music being played at work place.

6.Perforing Right Society Ltd vs Hammons Brandford Brewery Co. Ltd

In this case the court held importance on nature of the place where the performance took place. In this case, the plaintiff had given a license to the defendant to play the music in the hotel but the defendant used loudspeakers which by standers could also hear, the court held that this was a performance in public.

7. Performing Rights Society Ltd vs Camelo

The fact of the case as similar to the Brandford Brewery case, the defendant used loudspeakers which could be heard in the adjacent buildings, the court held there was an infringement because it was performed in public.

8. Mellor vs Australian Broadcasting Commission

The plaintiff by way of pamphlets stated their music was free for public performance, the plaintiff brought a suit of infringement against the defendant, the Privy Council, stated, “The original performance in the studio may be, and generally will be, a performance in private. In such a case the broadcast performance at the receiving end., if in public and unlicensed, will be an infringements of copyright at that place....... If the broadcast is picked up only by listeners in private it might be different to establish that there is a public performance : for each performance would be separate, and each would be private: but it is not necessary to express an opinion on this point.”

The Privy Council stated it didn’t express an opinion on whether the performance was in public or private.

Observations of the Bombay High Court

The Bombay High Court observations were guided by the various English cases. In most of these cases the owner of the copyright did give protection. In trying to answer the question of law presented before the court, the concluded three main conditions for the determination of where a work is performed in public or private, they are
 Nature of the audience,
  Whether the audience in relation to the owner of the copyright can be so considered and,
 Whether such performance effects the protection of the copyright holder.

Answering the first condition - Trying to answer the first one, the Court held that of course the movie is being viewed in the privacy of the home, but that doesn’t negate the fact that is can be seen by others in public setting. While explaining this situation, the Court, used the opined of Justice Mc Cardie in Messager v. British Broadcasting Company Ltd, “instead of gathering the audience in a theater, the defendants, by modern technology, are showing the film to that audience in their homes. To hold that this is not communication to the public would be to ignore the substance of the matter and the object and intent of the Copyright Act.”, thus the viewers are members of the public.

Answer to the second condition – The second condition related to the relationship between the owner of the copyright and the views, the Court held, that these viewers aren’t the domestic viewers of the plaintiff but rather members of the public.

Answer to the third condition – the last condition is generally used to determine the character of the audience in respect to the Indian Copyright Act,1957. The court opined the main aim of the Act is to give monetary gains to the owner for his/her intellectual property, the Court held that since the defendant charge  a fee for the cable services he has deprived the owner of the copyright.

The Court, concluded, “In my view, a strong prima facie case has been made out by the plaintiffs for granting them interim relief. Undoubtedly the business of the defendants will be affected as a result. But the plaintiffs will be severely affected if their copyright in the films is not protected, while the defendants can show the films after obtaining a licence under the Copyright Act.”

Judgment of the Court

The Court gave an interim order against the defendants from showing the film via cable t.v.

Similar Landmark case from the United States of America

American Broadcasting vs Aereo, Inc

In this case, the defendant provided an online facility for its viewers to view T.V. programs while they were being aired on the television. The owners of the programs who were producers contended that they are the copyright owners of the programs, and the action of the defendant amounted to infringements. The Court opined, that the defendant wasn’t showing the programs for free, they were showing them to their subscribers after they had paid a fee. They held that the defendant was depriving the copyright owners of their monetary gains from their intellectual property.

The U.S. Supreme Court held, the right to broadcast to the public was an exclusive right of the copyright owner as per the American Copyright Act, 1976, and they decided in favor of the plaintiff.

References

External links

Copyright case law
Indian case law
Doordarshan
Bombay High Court